Lakewood High School is a public secondary school in Woodland Township, Michigan, located in Barry County. In addition, the Lakewood School District includes Lakewood Middle School, Lakewood Elementary, and Lakewood Early Childhood Center.

History
The Lakewood School District consists primarily of the former Clarksville, Lake Odessa, Sunfield and Woodland school districts. It was founded in the early 1960s. In the spring of 1964, the first senior class, combining all the senior students in the district, was graduated. The senior class of 1965 was the first class to graduate from the new high school.

Enrollment
In the 2017, Lakewood High School had 630 students. It had 10% minority enrollment, 32 full-time teachers, and a graduation rate of 91%.

References

Public high schools in Michigan
Educational institutions established in 1961
Schools in Barry County, Michigan
1961 establishments in Michigan